Niccolò Fieschi (Genoa, c. 1456 – Rome, 1524) was an Italian Cardinal, of the prominent family of the Republic of Genoa, the Fieschi, which features in Verdi's Simon Boccanegra.

He was bishop of Fréjus from 1485, and bishop of Agde from 1488.  He was archbishop of Ravenna from 1516.

Notes

Nuccolo Fieschi can't be the Fieschi Verdi mantions in his Opera "Simon Boccanegra" since the Opera takes place in the middle of the 14th century and Niccolo lived in the 15th century.

External links

1450s births
1524 deaths
16th-century Italian cardinals
Cardinal-bishops of Albano
Cardinal-bishops of Ostia
Cardinal-bishops of Porto
Cardinal-bishops of Sabina
Bishops of Agde
Bishops of Fréjus
Bishops of Senez
Bishops of Toulon
15th-century Italian Roman Catholic bishops
16th-century Italian Roman Catholic archbishops
Deans of the College of Cardinals
Clergy from Genoa
15th-century Genoese people
Fieschi family